Mithat Yavaş (born 16 January 1975) is a retired Turkish football midfielder.

References

1975 births
Living people
Turkish footballers
Association football midfielders
Samsunspor footballers
Malatyaspor footballers
Kayserispor footballers
Manisaspor footballers
Dardanelspor footballers
Süper Lig players